Mykola Oleksandrovych Tsyhan (born 9 August 1984) is a Ukrainian football goalkeeper. He also holds Russian citizenship as Nikolay Aleksandrovich Tsygan.

References

External links
Mykola Tsygan at the official FC Alania Vladikavkaz  website 

1984 births
Living people
Sportspeople from Mykolaiv
Ukrainian footballers
Ukrainian expatriate footballers
Association football goalkeepers
FC Spartak Vladikavkaz players
PFC Krylia Sovetov Samara players
FC Sibir Novosibirsk players
FC Shinnik Yaroslavl players
PFC Spartak Nalchik players
FC Torpedo Moscow players
FC Van players
FC Lada-Tolyatti players
Russian Premier League players
Russian First League players
Russian Second League players
Armenian Premier League players
Expatriate footballers in Armenia
Ukrainian expatriate sportspeople in Russia
Ukrainian expatriate sportspeople in Armenia